The painted electric ray or variegated electric ray (Diplobatis pictus, sometimes misspelled picta) is a poorly known species of numbfish, family Narcinidae, native to the western Atlantic Ocean from southeastern Venezuela to the mouth of the Amazon River in Brazil. It is common on soft substrates at a depth of 2–120 meters.

References

painted electric ray
Fish of the Western Atlantic
Strongly electric fish
painted electric ray
Taxonomy articles created by Polbot
Taxobox binomials not recognized by IUCN